Kashkol (Urdu: کشکول) is a Pakistani Urdu-language television series directed by Nusrat Shaheen which aired in the 1993 on NTM.

Credits
It starred Talat Hussain Malik Anokha, Syed Kamal, Tahira Wasti and Aijaz Aslam. The term kashkol means a "beggar's bowl" and the television drama was based on a popular novel of the same name written by Hamid Kashmiri.

Cast 
 Talat Hussain
 Tahira Wasti
 Malik Anokha
 Syed Kamal
 Tauqeer Nasir
 Seemi Zaidi
 Rizwan Wasti
 Hassam Qazi
 Aijaz Aslam
 Shagufta Ejaz
 Shabbir Jan
 Jahanara Hai
 Mohammad Aamir Khan

See also
Pakistan Television
Network Television Marketing

References

1990s Pakistani television series
Pakistani drama television series
Pakistan Television Corporation original programming
Urdu-language television shows